Clemens Wientjes (8 February 1920 – 1998) was a German international footballer who played for 1. FC Nürnberg and Rot-Weiss Essen.

References

External links
 

1920 births
1998 deaths
Association football midfielders
German footballers
Germany international footballers
1. FC Nürnberg players
Rot-Weiss Essen players
Place of birth missing
West German footballers